James Keefe was an Irish RomanCatholic cleric who was the founder of St. Patrick's, Carlow College. He was Bishop of Kildare and Leighlin for over 35 years (1752-1787). He lived most of his time at Tullow, Co. Carlow.

He was preceded by Bishop James Gallagher in 1737 and succeeded by Bishop Daniel Delany in 1787, who was his co-adjutor Bishop and also helped in the foundation of Carlow College.

References

Roman Catholic bishops of Kildare and Leighlin